The 1988 UK Championship (also known as the 1988 Tennent's UK Championship for sponsorship reasons) was a professional ranking snooker tournament that took place between 19 and 27 November 1988 at the Guild Hall in Preston, England. This was the last UK Championship to be sponsored by Tennent's, and for the following two years the championship would be sponsored by StormSeal. The highest break of the tournament was 139 made by David Roe.

Doug Mountjoy won in the final 16–12 against Stephen Hendry, and picked up the £80,000 winners cheque. Mountjoy was 46 years old and remains the oldest winner of the UK Championship.

Main draw

Final

Century breaks

 139, 108  David Roe
 136, 101  Steve Davis
 136  Joe Johnson
 134, 124, 108  John Parrott
 133  Bill Werbeniuk
 132, 113, 103  Stephen Hendry
 132  Dene O'Kane
 131, 129, 124, 121, 118, 106  Doug Mountjoy
 128, 108  Terry Griffiths
 128, 106  Cliff Thorburn
 128  Robert Marshall
 120, 118, 115  Dean Reynolds
 118  Dave Martin

 113  Steve Campbell
 111  John Spencer
 109  Marcel Gauvreau
 108  Tony Jones
 106, 104  Gary Wilkinson
 106, 104  John Virgo
 105  Ken Owers
 105  Willie Thorne
 103, 101  Jimmy White
 102  Steve Longworth
 101  Warren King
 101  Martin Smith
 100  Steve Newbury

References

UK Championship (snooker)
UK Championship
UK Championship
UK Championship